Call to Arms is the fifth full-length studio album from American hardcore punk band Sick of It All. It was the band's first full-length release on Fat Wreck Chords and follows the 1998 EP, Potential for a Fall.

Critical reception
The A.V. Club called the album "packed with all the sturm und drang of its previous releases, bearing the hallmarks of virtually all good hardcore: breakneck speed, heavy guitar riffs, and shouting that would be unintelligible were it not for the lyric sheet." CMJ New Music Report wrote that the songs "come from the gut — anthems in the truest sense, flexing championship muscles that have been pumped up by working class bravado and street punk pride."

Track listing
All tracks written by Sick of It All.
"Let Go" –  1:09
"Call to Arms" –  1:48
"Potential for a Fall" –  2:28
"Falter" –  1:13
"The Future Is Mine" – 2:04
"Guilty" – 1:32
"Falling Apart" –  2:03
"Sanctuary" –  1:55
"Morally Confused" –  1:50
"Hindsight" – 2:27
"Martin" –  2:46
"Pass the Buck" –  1:27
"Quiet Man" –  2:40
"Drastic" –  1:23
"(Just A) Patsy" –  6:10*

*at the end of the album, there is a hidden track called "Greezy Wheezy". The band has also played it several times live and the video of it can be seen on the movie Sick of It All: The Story So Far.

Credits
Lou Koller – vocals
Pete Koller – guitar
Craig "Ahead" Setari – bass guitar
Armand Majidi – drums
Recorded at Big House, New York City
Produced by Sick of It All and John Seymour
Engineered by John Seymour

References

1999 albums
Fat Wreck Chords albums
Sick of It All albums